Barbarians Rising is an American docudrama television series executive produced by Adam Bullmore and produced by Chloe Leland and Michael Waterhouse that airs on History Channel. It premiered on June 6, 2016.

Synopsis
The series is told from the perspective of leaders of peoples that fought Rome, who were termed barbarians by the Romans. These individuals were famous for challenging the rule of Rome. Depictions of these leaders and historical events are interspersed with brief commentary from modern scholars, historians and experts on military and public policy.

Cast

 Nicholas Pinnock as Hannibal
 Jefferson Hall as Viriathus
 Ben Batt as Spartacus
 Tom Hopper as Arminius
 Kirsty Mitchell as Boudica
 Steven Waddington as Fritigern
 Gavin Drea as Alaric
 Emil Hostina as Attila
 Richard Brake as Geiseric

Episodes

Production
The History Channel ordered Barbarians Rising in December 2015. The cast, and the U.S. and Canadian premiere dates of June 6, 2016, were announced in May 2016.

Broadcast
History (Canada) debuted the miniseries the same month as the United States and has it available for viewing On Demand for a full year. Barbarians Rising premiered in the United Kingdom on August 31, 2016. It is scheduled to premiere in Italy and Australia on July 4, and in much of Europe on July 17. The series will premiere in Germany in September 2016, and in Japan, Spain and Portugal in fall 2016.

Reception
Despite the high number of viewers, the show received mixed reviews.
Brian P. Kelly of The Wall Street Journal gave Barbarians Rising a mixed review, commending History Channel "for offering a show that deals with, well, history" while also noting "the series is slowed to the point of exhaustion by its lengthy re-enactments". Verne Gay of Newsday was also mixed in his appraisal of the miniseries giving it a grade of 'C' and remarking that "The sword-and-sandal mini-epics here are lavishly produced, and (for the most part) dramatically comatose."

See also
 Barbarians (miniseries)

References

External links
 
 

History (American TV channel) original programming
2016 American television series debuts
2010s American drama television series
English-language television shows
Cultural depictions of Boudica
Depictions of Spartacus on television
Cultural depictions of Attila the Hun
Cultural depictions of Hannibal
Cultural depictions of Arminius
Television series set in the Roman Empire
Films directed by Maurice Sweeney